Edge of the World is a 2018 American drama film directed by Randy Redroad and starring Richard T. Jones, Trevor St. John, Will Meyers and Megan Dalby. the film premiered at the Dallas International Film Festival.

Cast
Noah Alford
Megan Dalby
Jonathan Daviss
Stephanie Felton
Austin Filson
Richard T. Jones
Jeff Justus
Rex Linn
Juan Martinez
Will Meyers
Mollie Milligan
Trevor St. John

Release
The film premiered at the 2018 Dallas International Film Festival. On March 2, 2019, it was shown at the Globe-News Center for the Performing Arts in Amarillo, Texas.

Reception
Ayurella Horn-Muller of Film Threat awarded the film 6.5 stars out of 10.

References

External links
 

2018 films
American drama films
2010s English-language films
2010s American films